Rajya Sabha elections were held on various dates in 2007 to elect members of the Rajya Sabha—the upper chamber of Indian Parliament.

Elections
Elections were held to elect members from various states.

Members elected
The following members are elected in the elections held in 2007. They are members for the term 2007–2013 and retire in year 2013, except in case of the resignation or death before the term.
The list is incomplete.

State - Member - Party

Bye-elections
The following bye elections were held in the year 2007. 

State - Member - Party
 Bye-elections were held on 29 March 2007 for vacancy from Punjab and Haryana   due to deaths of seating member Sukhbuns Kaur Bhinder on 15/12/2006 with term ending on 09/04//2010 and seating member Sumitra  Mahajan on 19/01/2007 with term ending on 09/04/2008
 West Bengal - Mohammed Amin - CPM ( ele 17/05/2007 term till 2011 ) (dea of Chittabrata Majumdar )

 Bye-elections were held on 4 October 2007 for vacancy from Uttar Pradesh due to resignation of seating member Mayawati on 05/07/2007 with term ending on 04/07/2010

References

2007 elections in India
2007